Aleodorus is a genus of rove beetles in the family Staphylinidae. There are at least four described species in Aleodorus.

Species
These four species belong to the genus Aleodorus:
 Aleodorus bilobatus (Say, 1830) i c g b
 Aleodorus intricatus (Casey, 1906) i c g b
 Aleodorus partitus (LeConte, 1866) i c g
 Aleodorus scutellaris (LeConte, 1866) i c g
Data sources: i = ITIS, c = Catalogue of Life, g = GBIF, b = Bugguide.net

References

Further reading

 
 
 
 
 
 
 
 
 
 
 
 
 

Aleocharinae
Articles created by Qbugbot